Zobor Abbey was a Benedictine monastery established at Zobor (today part of Nitra, Slovakia) in the Kingdom of Hungary. The abbey was first mentioned by royal charters issued in 1111 and 1113, during the rule of Coloman, King of Hungary.

References

Sources

Slovakia in the Kingdom of Hungary
Medieval Slovakia
Benedictine monasteries in Hungary